Chintan Vikas (born 1989) is an Indian playback singer, keyboard programmer, percussionist, vocal arranger, dubbing artiste and theatre activist, known for his works in Kannada. For his song Saahore Saahore in the film Gajakesari, Chintan Vikas won the Karnataka State Film Award for Best Male Playback Singer in 2014.

Early life 
Chintan Vikas was born in Mysore to theatre personalities H. Janardhan and Sumathi. His father, known as Janny, served as the director of the Rangayana.

Career 
Chintan entered the theatre as a street play artist at the age of four. He learnt Hindustani Classical Music from musician Veerabhadraiah Hiremath and became an assistant to the composer V. Manohar.

He has worked with many composers in the industry including Hamsalekha, V. Manohar, V. Harikrishna, Arjun Janya, B. Ajaneesh Loknath, Charan Raj and others.

Awards

Discography 
Selected film songs, recorded by Chintan Vikas, are listed here.

 All songs are in Kannada, unless otherwise noted

References

External links 

Kannada playback singers
Kannada people
21st-century Indian singers
People from Mysore district
Living people
Indian theatre people
Male actors in Kannada theatre
1989 births